Wayne Gretzky Hockey NHLPA All-Stars is a Super NES and Genesis/Mega Drive hockey video game that features Wayne Gretzky and other NHLPA players.

Gameplay
Players can play in exhibition mode, regular season mode, playoff mode, and even listen to stereotypical music of each nation in the sound test mode (country music for Canada, rock and roll music for Team USA, for example). In the Sega version, the players' names are formalized (Thomas instead of Tom, David instead of Dave, Steven instead of Steve, etc.).

Players can also have the CPU play some or all of their regular season, but the computer will lose more games than win them so it's important to play as many games as possible manually. In addition to American cities corresponding to real NHL teams, the player can also play as international teams (Sweden, Finland, Czechoslovakia, Russia, United States and Canada).

The game lacks the NHL license, meaning that teams are represented only by their corresponding city, rather than official name and logo.  On default settings, teams do not feature their appropriate colors, but the game can be customized so that each team's uniforms resemble their NHL counterparts.

Development
In late 1994, Time Warner Interactive signed hockey star Wayne Gretzky to a three-year deal for a line of signature video games. Wayne Gretzky and the NHLPA All-Stars was the first game to result from this deal, with Wayne Gretzky's 3D Hockey being the second. The original Genesis version was to be followed by versions for the SNES and PC, though the PC version was never released. An Atari Jaguar CD version was also in development and planned for a November 1995 release, but it was never published.

Producer Mitzi McGilvray of Time Warner Interactive recounted:

Reception

Slapshot McGraw of GamePro gave the Genesis version a rave review, praising the inclusion of fighting, the strong selection of teams, the "Just Play" option, and the general accessibility of the game, calling it "a terrific hockey game for both beginners and veterans." The two sports reviewers of Electronic Gaming Monthly gave it scores of 7.5 and 7 out of 10, variously praising the inclusion of fighting and the unique gameplay features, though one of the reviewers said he was "a bit disappointed by the overall performance of the game." Next Generation reviewed the Genesis version of the game, rating it three stars out of five, and stated that "This is an essentially different type of hockey game perfect for the younger gamer, but anyone looking for depth and simulation is advised to pass on this arcade-style effort."

Air Hendrix of GamePro gave the Super NES version a negative review, saying players can win just by repeated checking, with no need to use strategic plays or skillful footwork. He praised the graphics, noting the full motion video clips and large sprites, but said the animation is poor with sprites that "seem to float rather than skate". He summarized, "Fighting gamers may find momentary fun in this easy Wayne Gretzky cart, but hockey fans will shudder. Since both camps can find more satisfying action elsewhere, this mixed reaction earns Wayne a trip to the penalty box." A critic for Next Generation, while agreeing with Air Hendrix that the game is not a true hockey simulation, said that "it ain't bad" though "nothing special." Expressing the most pleasure with the comprehensive selection of modes and options, he gave it three out of five stars.

References

1995 video games
Cancelled Atari Jaguar games
Cancelled PC games
Multiplayer and single-player video games
National Hockey League video games
Sega Genesis games
Super Nintendo Entertainment System games
Time Warner Interactive games
Video games developed in the United States
Video games scored by Sam Powell
NHLPA All-Stars